The British Society for the History of Pharmacy (BSHP) is an organisation in the United Kingdom devoted to the history of pharmacy. It was established in 1967, although its roots date to 1952, when the Council of the Pharmaceutical Society established a history of pharmacy committee. The society has published a journal, Pharmaceutical Historian, from the beginning. Since 2017 it has been issued by BSHP on behalf of the International Society for the History of Pharmacy. From its foundation, BSHP has been keen to encourage the study of pharmacy history amongst students. This advocacy role has included providing lecturers for history courses at Schools of Pharmacy.

The organisation is affiliated with the International Society for the History of Pharmacy and the British Society for the History of Medicine. Its president is Chris Duffin.

References 

1967 establishments in England
Pharmacy organisations in the United Kingdom